Trigone may refer to:
 Trigone of the lateral ventricle
 Trigone of urinary bladder
 Hypoglossal trigone
 Olfactory trigone
 Vagal trigone
 Os trigonum, an accessory bone of the foot

See also
 Trigon (disambiguation)